Herman Piikea Clark (November 30, 1930  - October 9, 1989) is a former American football guard who played for the Chicago Bears in 1952 and from 1954–1957. He played college football at Oregon State University, and played in 52 games over five seasons for the Bears.

External links
Hawaii Sports Hall of Fame Profile
pro-football-reference

1930 births
American football offensive linemen
Chicago Bears players
1989 deaths
Punahou School alumni
Oregon State Beavers football players